Bubble Gum is a 2011 Hindi film directed by Sanjivan Lal. This film was released on July 29th, 2011 and upon release, it received critical praise.

Cast

Apoorva Arora - Jenny
Tanvi Azmi - Sudha Rawat
Prabh Sharan - Jenny's friend
 Sohail Lakhani - Vidur
 Harshvardhan Poddar - Partho
 Nishchal Srivastava - Ravi
 Delzad Sanjay Hiwale - Vedant
 Sachin Khedekar - Mukund Rawat
 Suraj Singh - Ratan Singh
 Ganesh Yadav - L F Rebello
 Sita Singh - Mrs. Rebello
 Azeen Khan - Jenny's friend
Nabanita Banerjee - Vedant's friend

Plot
Set in 1980 Jamshedpur, Vedant is a simple boy studying at Loyola School Jamshedpur in 10th Std, who is in love with a police officer's daughter whose name is Jenny. He is also irritated by his rival named Ratan. He always comes to Jenny's house and tries to impress her father by touching his feet (a means of showing respect as per Indian traditions). Vedant is always jealous of Ratan. Vedant's mother is a school teacher and his father is an engineer working in Tata Steel. His parents are quite irritated of the fact that he is not preparing for his board exam as his exams are right after Holi, which is around the corner. The same day, they get a telegram from Vedant's brother Vidur (who is deaf) telling that he finally is coming back from his hostel in Delhi after 4 years. The next day, they receive Vidur from the railway station. Vedant is quite delighted by seeing his brother. But one day, forgetting that Vidur is deaf, he closes the door of the house and goes outside. His parents come back and are shocked to see Vedant outside. They call a firefighter truck to use the ladder to get to their houses balcony so that the firefighter can open the door from inside. Mukund (Vedant's father) is quite angry and makes a decision that Vidur will always go out with him. When he takes him outside, everyone starts laughing when they see the way he plays kabbadi. Vedant becomes angry and tries to hit them. Disgruntled with their treatment, they complain to their father.

Critical reception
Rajeev Masand selected Bubble Gum as one of the 5 films he recommended to his readers in 2011. The film was also listed among the best films of 2011 by Hindustan Times.

Bubble Gum achieved critical acclaim among the Indian critics. Mayank Shekhar of Hindustan Times awarded the film 3 out of 5 stars, saying that "the pic is a sweet, rare, candid personal piece".

Taran Adarsh of Bollywood Hungama states that "Bubble Gum has its heart in the right place. A film that arrives with zilch expectations, but succeeds in taking you back in time when life was simpler and sweet. Recommended!".

References

External links 
 
 https://web.archive.org/web/20131214115416/http://www.coolage.in/2013/10/01/an-enlightening-colloquium-by-sanjivan-lal-director-and-film-mak/

2011 films
2010s Hindi-language films
Indian comedy films
2011 comedy films
Hindi-language comedy films
Films set in Jamshedpur